Ark Globe Academy (combining the former Geoffrey Chaucer Technology College and Joseph Lancaster Primary School) is a mixed all-through school located in Southwark, London, England.

The school caters for children from Reception age through to sixth form. It is part of the Ark school network, operated by the charitable organisation Ark. The academy moved to a new purpose-built combined building in 2010.

Globe Academy (later Ark Globe Academy) was created as an academy in 2008 from a merger of Geoffrey Chaucer Technology College and Joseph Lancaster Primary School.

 Barack Obama and David Cameron visited the school on 24 May 2011.

References

External links
 Official school site

Academies in the London Borough of Southwark
Primary schools in the London Borough of Southwark
Secondary schools in the London Borough of Southwark
Ark schools